The Fine Arts Work Center is a non-profit enterprise that encourages the growth and development of emerging visual artists and writers through residency programs, to the propagation of aesthetic values and experience, and to the restoration of the year-round vitality of the historic art colony of Provincetown, Massachusetts. The Work Center was founded in 1968 by a group of American artists and writers to support promising individuals in the early stages of their creative careers.  The Work Center, whose founders included Stanley Kunitz, Robert Motherwell, Myron Stout and Jack Tworkov, annually offers ten writers and ten visual artists seven-month residencies, including a work area and a monthly stipend.  The Center also offers a Master of Fine Arts degree in collaboration with the Massachusetts College of Art and Design, seasonal programs, and readings and other events. The Center was awarded a 2010 National Endowment for the Arts Access to Artistic Excellence grant to support the Winter Fellowship program.

The Center’s website summarizes the importance of the Center in this way:

Notable former fellows include writers Michael Cunningham, Alice Fulton, Louise Glück, Denis Johnson, Yusef Komunyakaa, Jhumpa Lahiri, Susan Mitchell and Franz Wright; and visual artists Yun-Fei Ji, Madhvi Parekh, Sam Messer and Lisa Yuskavage.

History 
The Fine Arts Work Center was founded in 1968 by a now illustrious group of artists, writers, and patrons, including Fritz Bultman, Salvatore and Josephine Del Deo, Alan Dugan, Stanley Kunitz, Philip Malicoat, Robert Motherwell, Myron Stout, Jack Tworkov, and Hudson D. Walker. The founders envisioned a place in Provincetown, the country's most enduring arts colony, where artists and writers could live and work together in the early phase of their careers. The founders believed that the freedom to pursue creative work within a community of peers is the best catalyst for artistic growth. The Work Center has dedicated itself to this mission for over forty years.

The Fellowship Program
Today the Fine Arts Work Center is a leading long-term residency program for emerging artists and writers and one of the most renowned. Each year the Visual Arts and Writing Committees, composed of internationally recognized artists and writers, select twenty Fellows (ten visual artists and ten writers) from some 1,000 applications worldwide. The selection process is rigorous, and the Fellows are accepted on the basis of the quality of work submitted.

For the seven-month period of October 1 to May 1, the selected painters, sculptors, installation, and time-based media artists, photographers, fiction writers and poets bring their lives to Provincetown to devote their time to their work. The Fellows receive living and studio space and a modest stipend. The only thing asked in return is that they stay in Provincetown and focus on their work. Each year, writing Fellows have the opportunity to publicly read from their work and visual artists are invited to exhibit in solo shows. All Fellows can publish their work online in the in-house art and literary journal Shankpainter.

Since the Work Center's founding, more than 800 Fellowships have been awarded. Fellows have made an enormous impact on American arts and letters, publishing hundreds of books and exhibiting their art in countless museums and galleries worldwide. Past Fellows have won virtually every major national award in their respective fields, including the Pulitzer, MacArthur, Whiting, Pollock-Krasner, Tiffany, Prix de Rome, Guggenheim, NEA, and National Book Award. The Fine Arts Work Center awards more fellowships each year than any other program of its kind. It is among the most competitive fellowship programs anywhere. Its presence in Provincetown, with its rich artistic heritage, stunning natural beauty and legendary light, enhances its renown.

The Summer Workshop Program
Each summer, the Fine Arts Work Center offers approximately eighty workshops focused on creative writing and the visual arts.  Hundreds of students study  with a faculty of master artists and writers; the workshops are week-long, extending over ten weeks from mid-June through late August. The Summer Workshop Program has been accredited by American University, Lesley University and Maine College of Art in Portland. Revenues from this program help support the Fellowships.

Other residency programs

The Fine Arts Work Center offers a Returning Residency Program that encourages former Fellows to return to Provincetown by offering apartments and studios at discount rates during a number of weeks in the Spring and Fall.

The Long-Term Residency Program for former Fellows was recently inaugurated, and extends the opportunity to live in Provincetown for up to three years at below-market rents.

In collaboration with other arts organizations around the country and abroad, the Fine Arts Work Center hosts one- to three-month Collaborative Residencies in the Summer and Fall. Writers or visual artists are selected on the merit of their work by the collaborating organization. Apartments, studio space and stipends are sponsored by the collaborating organizations; the Work Center provides the space in which to work and, perhaps most importantly, a community of like-minded peers with whom to share and discuss ideas, the very essence of collaboration.

The Ohio Arts Council, a collaborative residency partner since 1994, sends a writer and a visual artist for three months every summer. The Maryland Institute College of Art sends one visual artist each year for a two-month period. For the past several years Four Way Books has sponsored one month-long residency for poets published by the press. The Copley Society of Boston, also a long-time collaborative partner, awards a one-month residency to a visual artist. The Gaea Foundation also works in collaboration with the Work Center, though its residents live off-site in a cottage on Commercial Street. Artists, writers, musicians and performers, usually with a political or activist bent, are given one- to two-month residencies and a stipend to live and work in Provincetown.

The MFA in Visual Arts
Since September 2005 the Massachusetts College of Art and Design has collaborated with the Fine Arts Work Center to offer a low-residency Master of Fine Arts program in Provincetown. Candidates selected by the Boston-based MassArt study and work in Provincetown at the Center during four 24-day residencies in September and May over the course of the two-year program. They are taught and evaluated by a faculty of prominent resident and visiting artists. During the periods between the Provincetown residencies, the students, many of whom are already pursuing careers in the arts, return home to work under the guidance of approved mentors who visit their studios once a month. On-line history and academic courses support an understanding of the historical and cultural context of contemporary work, including their own. At the conclusion of the program, candidates return to the Work Center for a final two-week residency in September to present their thesis shows, participate in thesis reviews and submit their written theses.

The Visiting Artists and Writers Series
Since 1968 the Fine Arts Work Center has brought nationally recognized artists and writers to Provincetown for public lectures, readings and exhibitions. Each year thousands of people enjoy these presentations, which are free and open to the public. These events occur throughout the year.  Recent visiting artists and writers include Galway Kinnell, Marge Piercy, Mark Doty, Paula Vogel, Robert Pinsky, Oscar Hijuelos, Jonathan Franzen, Richard Prince, Ha Jin, Marilynne Robinson, Denis Johnson, Mark Strand, and Bill Jensen.

Readings and talks are scheduled year-round.

References

External links

Art schools in Massachusetts
Educational institutions established in 1968
Provincetown, Massachusetts
1968 establishments in Massachusetts
Artist colonies